Bungtang (Currently Myagang Rural Municipality Ward no.2) बुङताङ is a village development committee in Nuwakot District in the Bagmati Zone  (Bagmati Province  ) of central Nepal. At the time of the 2011 Nepal census it had a population of 3288 living in 743 individual households.

The original name of the village was "Bomtang". In Bhot language "Bomo" बोमो means Daughter or female "Tang" तङ means "being happy". "Bomtang" was such a beautiful place that women/female used to be happy when they come here. Hence the name "Bomtang". Later as it passed on was written Bungtang(बुङताङ).

References

External links
म्यागङ गाउँपालिका
UN map of the municipalities of Nuwakot District
Drone shot

Populated places in Nuwakot District
Wards and electoral divisions of Nepal